or  is a mountain in Tromsø Municipality in Troms og Finnmark county, Norway. Snowfall varies from one year to another, but the peak is usually snow free only for a few months in the summer. The mountain is easily spotted from the city centre of Tromsø. The summit is a popular hike, requiring nothing more than good shoes, normal physical condition, and plenty to drink.

Etymology 
The Norwegian name Tromsdalstinden means "the peak above Tromsdalen", while the Sámi name is made up from the components Sálaš and Oaivi. The first word signifies a good hunting area, the second literally translates as "head" but when speaking of landscapes indicate a mountain that is rounded, i.e. does not have any jagged peaks.

Skiing and hiking 
Hikers may summit Tromsdalstinden either from the suburb Tromsdalen, or from Ramfjorden. The slopes up are not technically difficult, though fog and rain can make the ascent complicated for those not familiar with the terrain. When approaching the mountain from the southeast (Ramfjorden), though, hikers and skiers must at one point move over the southwestern or northwestern (city-facing) sides of the mountain as the mountain becomes too steep. The best season for hiking is May through September. Skiers usually take the Fjellheisen aerial tramway to Storsteinen, and begin their ascent from there. There are two main treks, the Winter trek and the Summer trek.

The Winter trek
A ski trip that starts on the southwest side of the mountain (on the right in the pictures) which is called Salen (the Saddle). When descending, skiers zig-zag down from the top until they reach the minor lake Tromsdalsvannet (nor.) or Moskojávri (sám.) in the innermost part of the Tromsdalen valley.

The Summer trek
A hike that starts on the zig-zag trek used to descend when skiing. On the way back, hikers follow the narrow northeastern ridge of the mountain (left on the pictures). The descent route at one point takes you quite close to the steep drop behind the mountain, and as such may not be suitable for hikers prone to vertigo. For such hikers, it is perhaps a better recommendation to go back the way they came.

Straight up
Also, it is possible to ascend from the northwest, i.e. straight up from the valley. Hikers then start at the Nerloftet (a low plateau above the Tromsdalen valley), proceed to the half-way stop Loftet (a protruding part of the mountain facing the city), and then go straight up. When the mountain becomes too steep to keep going straight, you go upwards to the right until you're on the 'winter route' (the right slope). The names of these points mean, respectively, the Lower Attic and the Attic. This route is quite steep and thus demanding, but safe - although some rocks may be slippery, or loose, so one should be careful.

Controversy over Sámi cultural significance 
In 2003 Tromsø applied to host the 2014 Winter Olympics. The proposal to the International Olympic Committee featured plans to build an alpine skiing facility on the slopes of the mountain. This sparked immediate protests from some Sami activists who claimed that Tromsdaltinden has been a Sami sacred mountain since ancient times. A heated debate ensued over whether Tromsdalstinden could be considered "holy" or not.

The Sami Parliament enacted a resolution declaring it a holy mountain in 2004, and the plans were discontinued. The Sámi Parliament does not in fact have any formal authority to declare objects 'sacred', but their resolution was listened to anyway. Lawyers in the aftermath discussed the possibility of defining a mountain as a cultural relic according to the definition of "cultural relic" in the law.

Professor Siv Ellen Kraft from the department of Religious Studies, University of Tromsø wrote an article suggesting that Tromsdalstind was made a holy mountain in recent times as a part of sami identity politics. However, the mountain is also reckoned by Sámi people in the region to have been sacred at one point, before Christianization. The mountain bears the significant feature of a traditional sacred mountain - i.e. that it dominates the landscape due to shape and/or height. As the classic Sámi religion is dead and only elements survive through local vestiges and neo-shamanism; a good case can be made that the mountain is no longer sacred to most Sámi in the traditional sense. Still, the level of commitment to the preserving the mountain shown by the Sámi - up to the point of having the Sámi parliament pronounce it sacred - quite effectively display the intense cultural significance of the mountain to modern Sámi also, a significance which is indeed rooted in the religious traditions of ones ancestors.

Media gallery

References

External links 
 Tromsdalstinden - pictures and information
 370° Tromsdalstind panorama picture from the peak CC Harald Groven

Mountains of Troms og Finnmark
Sacred mountains
Tromsø